Safonovka is a rural locality (a settlement) in Chemrovsky Selsoviet, Zonalny District, Altai Krai, Russia. The population was 403 as of 2013. There are 5 streets.

Geography 
Safonovka is located 18 km southeast of Zonalnoye (the district's administrative centre) by road. Mirny is the nearest rural locality.

References 

Rural localities in Zonalny District